Ctenopterus is a genus of prehistoric eurypterid of the family Stylonuridae. It contains only one species, Ctenopterus cestrotus from the Early Silurian of Otisville, New York.

Description
 
Stylonurids, which lived from the Ordovician to Lower Permian periods, were small to very large forms with scales developing into tubercules and knobs.  The prosoma (head) exhibited variable shape, with arcuate compound eyes located subcentrally, or anteriorly.  Their abdomens were slender.  Their walking legs were long and powerful, sometimes characterized by spines.  Most genera did not have swimming legs.

Ctenopterus is distinguished by its prosoma (head), which narrows towards the front.  All of its legs are walking legs; the second and third pairs are strongly developed, with a double row of numerous flat spines; the last pair is long, without spines.  Ctenopterus dates from the Silurian period.

See also
 List of eurypterids

References

Stylonuroidea
Silurian eurypterids
Fossils of the United States
Eurypterids of North America